Iron Sky is a 2012 comic-science-fiction action film directed by Timo Vuorensola and written by Johanna Sinisalo and Michael Kalesniko. It tells the story of a group of Nazi Germans who, having been defeated in 1945, fled to the Moon, where they built a space fleet to return in 2018 and conquer Earth. Iron Sky is one of the most expensive Finnish films.

Iron Sky comes from the creators of Star Wreck: In the Pirkinning and was produced by Tero Kaukomaa of Blind Spot Pictures and Energia Productions, co-produced by New Holland Pictures and 27 Films, and co-financed by numerous individual supporters; Samuli Torssonen was responsible for the computer-generated imagery. It was theatrically released throughout Europe in April 2012. A director's cut of the film with 20 additional minutes was released on DVD and Blu-ray on 11 March 2014.

A video-game adaptation titled Iron Sky: Invasion was released in October 2012.

A sequel, titled Iron Sky: The Coming Race, was crowdfunded through Indiegogo and released in January 2019.

Plot

In 2018, an American crewed mission lands on the Moon. The lander carries two astronauts, one of them an African-American male model, James Washington, specifically chosen to aid the U.S. President in her re-election (various "Black to the Moon" word-play posters are seen in the film, extolling the new Moon landing).

Upon landing on the far side of the Moon, they encounter the descendants of Nazis who escaped to the Moon in 1945 (self-styled the "Fourth Reich" in dialogue). Washington is taken captive after the other astronaut is killed. Nazi scientist Doktor Richter examines Washington and obtains his smartphone, which he later recognizes as having more computing power than the 1940s-style computers of the Fourth Reich, enabling its use as a control unit to complete their giant space battleship Götterdämmerung.

When Richter strives to demonstrate his Wunderwaffe to the current Führer, Wolfgang Kortzfleisch, the phone's battery is quickly exhausted. Nazi commander Klaus Adler, chosen for genetic reasons to mate with Earth specialist Renate Richter (Doktor Richter's daughter), embarks in a flying saucer to collect more such computers on Earth. He takes with him Washington, who has been "Aryanized" by Doktor Richter using an "albinizing" drug.

Upon landing in New York City, they discover that Renate has stowed away with them. They abandon Washington after he connects them with the President's campaign adviser, Vivian Wagner. Adler and Renate energize the President's re-election campaign using Nazi-style rhetoric. Renate is unaware of Adler's ambition to replace Kortzfleisch and rule the world. After three months, Kortzfleisch lands on Earth and confronts Adler, but is killed by Adler and Vivian. Adler declares himself the new Führer before returning to orbit in Kortzfleisch's flying saucer, deserting Vivian but taking her tablet computer.

Concurrently, Renate is persuaded by the homeless Washington that Adler intends global genocide. Shortly afterwards, the Moon Nazis launch a mass attack on the Earth with a fleet of giant Zeppelin-like spacecraft called Siegfrieds which tow asteroids as missiles and launch countless flying saucers at New York City, where they destroy the Statue of Liberty and blitz the city. The U.S. Air Force engage the flying saucers with some success.

The United Nations assembles to discuss the Moon Nazi threat. The President appoints Vivian as commander of the secretly militarised spacecraft USS George W. Bush, which carries nuclear and directed-energy weapons, only to discover that most of the other nations (except Finland) have also secretly armed their spacecraft. They dispatch them against the Nazi fleet and wipe out the Siegfrieds.

Adler arrives in Kortzfleisch's flying saucer with the tablet computer to activate the Götterdämmerung. Renate and Washington travel in Adler's flying saucer to the Götterdämmerung, where Washington goes to disable the engines while Renate seeks out Adler. Meanwhile, the international space fleet damage the Nazis' Moon base and approach the Götterdämmerung which dwarfs them all. Commanding the Götterdämmerung, Adler destroys parts of the Moon to expose Earth to his line-of-fire. During the battle, Washington disconnects Vivian's tablet from the control panel of the Götterdämmerung, while Renate kills Adler before he can fire at Earth. Renate and Washington separately escape as the Götterdämmerung crashes into the Moon.

The U.S. president congratulates Vivian from the UN session; whereupon Vivian discloses the presence of large tanks of helium-3 on the Moon, of which the President immediately assumes sole claim on grounds that its possession ensures a millennium-long supply of energy. This enrages the other UN members, who engage in a brawl, while the international fleet turn on each other.

At the damaged Moon base, Renate reunites with Washington, who has reverted his pigmentation back to normal. They kiss before a confused group of Nazi survivors, whom Renate assures, "have a lotta work cut out for [them]". The final moments of the film show the Earth apparently during an international nuclear war. At the very end of the credits, the planet Mars is revealed with an artificial satellite in orbit.

Cast
 Julia Dietze as Renate Richter
 Götz Otto as Klaus Adler
 Christopher Kirby as James Washington
 Tilo Prückner as Doktor Richter
 Udo Kier as  Wolfgang Kortzfleisch
 Peta Sergeant as Vivian Wagner
 Stephanie Paul as the President of the United States (a parody of Sarah Palin)
 Michael Cullen as Secretary of Defense

Production
Production began in early 2006, and the production team took their teaser trailer of the film to the 2008 Cannes Film Festival, seeking co-financiers. The team signed a co-production agreement with Oliver Damian's 27 Films Productions. Iron Sky is one of a new wave of productions, including Artemis Eternal, The Cosmonaut, A Swarm of Angels, and RiP!: A Remix Manifesto, produced in collaboration with an on-line community of film enthusiasts, creating participatory cinema. At Wreck-a-Movie, a collaborative film-making web site, the producers invited everyone interested to contribute ideas and resources to the project.

On 11 February 2009, it was announced that the film would star German actress Julia Dietze, while the Slovenian industrial music group Laibach would be recording the soundtrack. Appropriately enough for a film about Nazism, the orchestral soundtrack incorporates leitmotifs from the operatic cycle Der Ring des Nibelungen and other operas by Richard Wagner, a composer whose music was favoured by the Nazi leaders. The national anthem of the Nazis from the Moon ("Kameraden, wir kehren Heim!") has the tune of "Die Wacht am Rhein". During the 2010 Cannes Film Festival, Iron Sky signed a co-production agreement with the Australian production company New Holland Pictures, which brought Cathy Overett and Mark Overett as co-producers of the film.

Iron Sky was video-recorded in Red camera format. Cinematography began in November 2010 in Frankfurt for location shooting, and after that in January 2011 in Australia for studio shooting. On 6 February 2011, the cinematography of Iron Sky concluded; it then entered a ten-week post-production process.

Release
Iron Sky premiered on 11 February 2012 at the 62nd Berlin International Film Festival, in the Panorama Special section. It was released in Finland on 4 April and in Germany on 5 April, running in major cinemas.

In the UK, there was some controversy regarding the decision of the distributor, Revolver Entertainment, to release the film for only one day, causing the film makers to issue a public condemnation of their UK distributor, and accusing Revolver of misleading them. Following high demand from the film's online fanbase, Revolver revised its decision and Iron Sky'''s UK cinema release was extended.

Reception
Critical reception of Iron Sky in the United States was negative. On Rotten Tomatoes, the film has a 41% approval rating, based on 44 reviews, with an average rating of 4.5/10.

William Goss of Film.com gave the film a D+, saying that it "feels more and more like a lost Austin Powers sequel that already feels exceedingly dated in its humor." Jeff Shannon of The Seattle Times gave the film two out of four stars, describing it as "great idea, lousy execution". Leslie Felperin of Variety described Iron Sky as being "...neither good enough to rep a proper breakout hit nor bad enough that it might attain cult status; it’s just kind of lame".

Accolades
The film won Best Visual Effects at the 2nd AACTA Awards.

Spin-offs

Comic
On 5 October 2011, Blind Spot released a digital comic prequel to the film, titled Iron Sky: Bad Moon Rising, written by the writer of Alan Wake, Mikko Rautalahti, and fully illustrated by comic artist Gerry Kissell, creator of IDW Publishing's Code Word: Geronimo. IDW Publishing printed these comics in a softcover graphic novel collection in March 2013.

Video game
On 19 August 2012, TopWare Interactive announced Iron Sky: Invasion, an official video game adaptation and expansion of the film, to be developed by Reality Pump Studios. The game was described as an advanced space flight simulator game, with elements of the strategy and RPG genres.

Board game
In 2012, Revision Games published Iron Sky: The Board Game, a board game based on the film designed by Juha Salmijärvi. It is a strategy board game, where two opposing teams The Reich and The UWC struggle for domination over three continents of Earth. Each player is in charge of one continent and cooperation within each team is mandatory for success.

Sequel

On 20 May 2012, Kaukomaa announced that there are plans for a prequel and a sequel but refused to disclose details. In May 2013, Vuorensola announced that Iron Sky will have a sequel titled Iron Sky: The Coming Race. He also mentioned that unlike the first film, this installment will be completely funded by fans via Indiegogo, with an estimated budget of US$15 million. A promo video was to be shot for the 2014 Cannes Film Festival and the final draft of the script was scheduled to be published by the end of 2014. Filming was expected to begin in 2015. In July 2013, Vuorensola revealed Croatia as one of the proposed shooting locations. In February 2014, Dalan Musson signed in to write the screenplay. The Finnish Film Foundation and Medienboard Berlin-Brandenburg have come on board to finance the US$13 million project. Ultimately, this schedule was not maintained. In 2017, a January 2018 release date was announced. That date was missed, as was an August 2018 release. The movie was ultimately released in March 2019.

Producers bankruptcy
Blind Spot Pictures, the main production company for Iron Sky, declared bankruptcy on 17 September 2019. Iron Sky Universe Oy production company was filed for bankruptcy 12 October 2020 by Ilmarinen Mutual Pension
Insurance Company.
Timo Vuorensola himself also confirmed that Iron Sky Universe had filed for bankruptcy, saying "The production company of Iron Sky, called Iron Sky Universe, one which I jointly set up with Tero, is going under."

See also
 Colonization of the Moon
 Rocket Ship Galileo, Robert A. Heinlein's 1947 novel in which Nazis establish a secret base on the Moon.
 The Iron Dream, a similarly titled novel by Norman Spinrad also concerning Nazism.
 Nazis at the Center of the Earth, a mockbuster of Iron Sky'' by The Asylum.

References

External links
 
 
 
 
 

2012 action comedy films
2012 science fiction action films
2010s science fiction comedy films
2012 films
Alternate Nazi Germany films
Apocalyptic films
Australian alternative history films
Australian political satire films
Australian science fiction action films
Australian science fiction comedy films
Cultural depictions of Sarah Palin
Dieselpunk films
2010s English-language films
English-language Finnish films
English-language German films
Fictional Nazis
Films about fictional presidents of the United States
Films about Nazis
Films adapted into comics
Films directed by Timo Vuorensola
Films set in 2018
Films set in Jersey City, New Jersey
Films set in Manhattan
Films set in Washington, D.C.
Films shot in Brisbane
Films shot in Frankfurt
Films shot in New York City
Finnish alternate history films
Finnish political satire films
Finnish science fiction films
German action comedy films
German alternate history films
2010s German-language films
German political satire films
German science fiction action films
German science fiction comedy films
Mad scientist films
Moon in film
Science fiction war films
Films about World War III
Films about nuclear war and weapons
2010s German films